Ana Patricia Botín-Sanz de Sautuola O'Shea, DBE is a Spanish banker who has served as the executive chairman of Santander Group since 2014. She is the fourth generation of the Botín family to hold this role. Prior to this she was chief executive officer (CEO) of Santander UK, a role she held from December 2010 until her assumption of the chairmanship.

In February 2013, she was ranked the third most powerful woman in the UK by Woman's Hour on BBC Radio 4. In 2017, 2019, and 2020, Forbes ranked her the 8th most powerful woman in the world.

Early life 
Botín is the daughter of Spanish banker Emilio Botín, who was the executive chairman of Spain's Grupo Santander, and Paloma O'Shea. She received her high school education at St Mary's School, Ascot. She studied economics at Bryn Mawr College.

Career
Botín worked at JP Morgan in the US from 1981 to 1988. In 1988, she returned to Spain and began working for the Santander Group. During that time, she was involved in the bank's 1997 acquisition of a 51 percent stake in Banco Osorno y La Union, the largest bank in Chile, for $495 million. In 2002, she became the executive chairman of the Spanish bank, Banesto. In November 2010, Botín succeeded António Horta Osório as chief executive of Santander UK.

In 2013, Botín was appointed a director of the Coca-Cola Company.

In September 2014, Botín was appointed chair of the Santander Group. She is the fourth generation of the Botín family to hold this role. Since taking charge she has brought in more international board members, embraced technology and strengthened the US and Latin America management teams.

Other activities 
In 2015, Prime Minister David Cameron of the United Kingdom named Botín to become a member of his business advisory board. In 2020, the International Monetary Fund's Managing Director Kristalina Georgieva appointed her to an external advisory group to provide input on policy challenges. In early 2021, she was appointed by the G20 to the High Level Independent Panel (HLIP) on financing the global commons for pandemic preparedness and response, co-chaired by Ngozi Okonjo-Iweala, Tharman Shanmugaratnam and Lawrence Summers.

Other positions include: 
 Mayor's Fund for London, Member of the Board of Trustees (since 2012)
 Bilderberg Group, Member of the Steering Committee
 Elcano Royal Institute for International and Strategic Studies, Member of the Board of Trustees
 Fundación Albéniz, Member of the Board of Trustees
 Fundación Conocimiento y Desarrollo (Fundación CYD), Founder and President
 Fundación Mujeres por África, Member of the Board of Trustees
 Institute of International Finance (IFF), Chair-Elect
 National Museum and Research Center of Altamira, Member of the Board of Trustees

Recognition 
First listed in 2005, Botín was ranked as the eighth most powerful woman in the world by Forbes in 2018, 2019, and 2020.

 2015 – Dame Commander of the Order of the British Empire for services to the British financial sector
 2015 – FIRST Award for Responsible Capitalism

Personal life
In 1983, Botín married fellow banker Guillermo Morenés y Mariátegui, son of the 9th Marquess of Borghetto, a wealthy landowner. They have three children: Felipe Morenés Botín, Javier Morenés Botín, and Pablo Morenés Botín.

The family owns a large estate in Ciudad Real, south of Madrid. In 2010, Morenés y Mariátegui bought a six-bedroom home in Belgravia, London. They also own a house in the Swiss ski resort of Gstaad.

See also 

 List of female top executives

References

External links
 Profile of Ana Patricia Botin - Santander.com (in Spanish)
 Ana Patricia Botín - Twitter

Spanish chairpersons of corporations
Living people
People from Santander, Spain
Businesspeople from Cantabria
Bryn Mawr College alumni
Spanish bankers
Women corporate directors
Honorary Dames Commander of the Order of the British Empire
Spanish expatriates in the United States
Directors of The Coca-Cola Company
People educated at St Mary's School, Ascot
Women bankers
20th-century Spanish businesswomen
20th-century Spanish businesspeople
21st-century Spanish businesswomen
21st-century Spanish businesspeople
Members of the Board of Directors of the Banco Santander
Year of birth missing (living people)